Dr. Susan LaFlesche Picotte Memorial Hospital, also known as Walthill Hospital or Dr. Susan Picotte Memorial Hospital, is a former hospital building at 505 Matthewson Street in Walthill, Nebraska, on the Omaha Indian Reservation.  The hospital was developed by Dr. Susan LaFlesche Picotte (1865–1915), the first female Native American medical doctor.  Built with money raised by Picotte from various sources, it was the first hospital for any Indian reservation not funded by government money.  It served the community as a hospital until the 1940s, and has had a variety of other uses since.  It was declared a National Historic Landmark in 1993.

Description and history
The Picotte Hospital building is located on the western fringe of Walthill, on the north side of Matthewson Street near its junction with Sawyer Street.  The building was designed by architect William L. Steele in 1912 and built in 1912–1913.  Set on a concrete foundation on a hill overlooking Walthill, the one-and-one-half-story hospital was built in the American Craftsman style of architecture.  Typical of Craftsman style, it features a low-pitched, shingled (originally wood-shingled) roof, wide eaves with large braces beneath, exposed roof rafter tails, and a centered gabled dormer.  A prominent screened porch runs the entire length of the front (east side) of the structure, bounded by  columns that support the roof.

Susan LaFlesche Picotte was born into the Omaha tribe in 1865.  Her father, Joseph LaFlesche, was the tribe's last recognized chief, and saw to it that his children were well educated and could integrate into white society.  Trained in medicine at the Women's Medical College of Pennsylvania, she returned to the reservation, where she eventually became its primary medical provider.  The hospital was built through her fundraising efforts, which yielded the $8,000 needed from a variety of private philanthropic sources.  The building was a working hospital until the late 1940s, after which it served a variety of functions since, including a museum.  As of 2013, it housed Mi'Jhu'Wi Ministries, a nonprofit providing services to the people of the Omaha Reservation.

See also
List of National Historic Landmarks in Nebraska
National Register of Historic Places listings in Thurston County, Nebraska

References

External links

Picotte Memorial Hospital, from a National American Indian Heritage Month feature at the National Park Service

Hospital buildings completed in 1912
National Historic Landmarks in Nebraska
Buildings and structures in Thurston County, Nebraska
Hospital buildings on the National Register of Historic Places in Nebraska
William L. Steele buildings
La Flesche family
1912 establishments in Nebraska
National Register of Historic Places in Thurston County, Nebraska
Native American health